Summit is a census-designated place (CDP) in Pima County, Arizona, United States. The population was 3,702 at the 2000 census.

Geography
Summit is located at  (32.063213, -110.943549).

Demographics

At the 2000 census there were 3,702 people, 1,144 households, and 871 families living in the CDP. The racial makeup of the CDP was 65.9% White, 0.5% Black or African American, 2.2% Native American, 0.1% Asian, <0.1% Pacific Islander, 26.0% from other races, and 5.3% from two or more races.  63.5% of the population were Hispanic or Latino of any race.
Of the 1,144 households 46.7% had children under the age of 18 living with them, 55.6% were married couples living together, 13.4% had a female householder with no husband present, and 23.8% were non-families. 18.4% of households were one person and 5.9% were one person aged 65 or older.  The average household size was 3.24 and the average family size was 3.68.

The age distribution was 34.8% under the age of 18, 10.0% from 18 to 24, 29.8% from 25 to 44, 18.4% from 45 to 64, and 6.9% 65 or older.  The median age was 29 years. For every 100 females, there were 107.3 males.  For every 100 females age 18 and over, there were 103.7 males.

The median household income was $28,485 and the median family income  was $31,806. Males had a median income of $21,316 versus $21,333 for females. The per capita income for the CDP was $11,274.  About 22.0% of families and 26.2% of the population were below the poverty line, including 42.9% of those under age 18 and 9.0% of those age 65 or over.

References

Census-designated places in Pima County, Arizona
Populated places in the Sonoran Desert